Alba is a unisex given name of Latin origin meaning "white".  In Spanish and Italian the name means sunrise or "dawn". In Spanish and Italian speaking countries it is considered to be a female name. It can also be used as a Spanish surname, as in the actress Jessica Alba, or a title, as in the Spanish Dukedom of Alba. It may also be considered a feminine version of Albert or Albinus or of names beginning with the Germanic Alf.

Alba is also the Scottish Gaelic name for Scotland and the alba is a subgenre of Occitan lyric poetry.

Notable people
 Alba August (born 1993), Danish-Swedish actress
 Alba Baptista (born 1997), Portuguese actress 
 Alba Bautista (born 2002), Spanish rhythmic gymnast 
 Alba Calderón (1908–1992), Ecuadorian painter
 Alba Flores (born 1986), Spanish actress
 Alba Gaïa Bellugi (born 1995), a French actress
 Alba Milana (born 1959), an Italian long-distance runner
 Alba Mujica (1916-1983), Argentinian actress
 Alba Nydia Díaz (born 1955), Puerto Rican actress
 Alba Redondo (born 1996), Spanish footballer
 Alba Ribas, Spanish actress
 Alba Rohrwacher (born 1979), Italian actress
 Alba Silvius, an ancient Roman king of Alba Longa

References

See also
 Alba (surname)
 Alba (disambiguation)

Feminine given names